John Thomson Mason (15 March 1765 – 10 December 1824) was an American lawyer and Attorney General of Maryland in 1806.

Early life
Mason was born on 15 March 1765 at Chopawamsic in Stafford County, Virginia. He was the third child and youngest son of Thomson Mason and his wife Mary King Barnes.

Education

Early career
Mason operated a plantation in what was then Washington County, Maryland near Elizabethtown (now Hagerstown using enslaved labor.

Admitted to the Maryland bar, he attained high rank, but twice declined the office of United States Attorney General when it was offered by Presidents Thomas Jefferson and James Madison. Mason ran for one of Maryland's seats in the United States Senate, but lost. He then served as Attorney General of Maryland in 1806. He was also one of six judges appointed to a newly restructured court of appeals by Governor Robert Bowie on 19 January 1806, but declined the appointment.

Marriages and children

Mason married Elizabeth Beltzhoover in 1797. He and Elizabeth had seven children:

Mary Barnes Mason Winter (c. 1800–11 May 1844)
Elizabeth Ann Armistead Thomson Mason Wharton (4 April 1803–20 January 1857)
Abram Barnes Mason Barnes (21 October 1807–10 April 1863)
Melchior Beltzhoover Mason (born 3 October 1812)
John Thomson Mason, Jr. (9 May 1815–28 March 1873)
Thomson Mason (15 July 1818–1848)
Virginia Wallace Mason (16 April 1820–6 October 1858)

Later life
Mason died on 10 December 1824 at the age of 59. Mason was interred at his Montpelier estate in Clear Spring, Maryland.

Relations
John Thomson Mason was a nephew of George Mason (1725–1792); son of Thomson Mason (1733–1785); brother of Stevens Thomson Mason (1760–1803); half-brother of William Temple Thomson Mason (1782–1862); first cousin of George Mason V (1753–1796); first cousin once removed of Thomson Francis Mason (1785–1838), George Mason VI (1786–1834), Richard Barnes Mason (1797–1850), and James Murray Mason (1798–1871); uncle of Armistead Thomson Mason (1787–1819) and John Thomson Mason (1787–1850); father of John Thomson Mason Jr. (1815–1873); and great uncle of Stevens Thomson Mason (1811–1843).

References

1765 births
1824 deaths
18th-century American Episcopalians
19th-century American Episcopalians
American people of English descent
American planters
American slave owners
British North American Anglicans
Maryland Attorneys General
Maryland lawyers
Mason family
People from Stafford County, Virginia
United States Attorneys for the District of Columbia